A list of films produced by the Israeli film industry in 2005.

2005 releases

Awards

Notable deaths

 January 29 – Ephraim Kishon, Israeli satirist, dramatist, screenwriter and film director, apparent heart attack. (b. 1924).

See also
2005 in Israel

References

External links
 Israeli films of 2005 at the Internet Movie Database

Israeli
Film
2005